Liu Dexiang (born 20 January 1993) is a Chinese professional racing cyclist, who most recently rode for UCI Women's Continental Team .

References

External links

1993 births
Living people
Chinese female cyclists
Place of birth missing (living people)
21st-century Chinese women